The Peoples College of Law (PCL) is an unaccredited, private, non-profit, Juris Doctor-granting law school
located in the downtown Los Angeles community of Westlake-MacArthur Park. PCL offers a part-time, four-year evening law program centered on work in the public interest.

History
Aimed at addressing inequities in law and society, PCL was founded in 1974 for individuals historically denied access to legal training and representation. The school maintains a socio-political requirement that states: "An eligible candidate will be able to demonstrate a commitment to progressive social change."

State Bar registration
PCL is not accredited by the American Bar Association, and is regulated by the California State Bar Committee of Bar Examiners of the State Bar of California as an unaccredited law school that may grant the juris doctor (J.D.) law degree. Its students must take and pass the First-Year Law Students' Examination, also known as the "Baby Bar", at the end of their first year in order to receive credit for their law study and eventually qualify to sit for the California Bar Examination. It is not approved or accredited by the American Bar Association, nor is it accredited by the State Bar of California.

Bar pass rates
From 2010 through 2015, 32 People's College graduates took the California Bar Examination; of that number, 6 passed the examination for a pass rate of 18%.

Cost
People's College of Law has one of the lowest tuition rates for a J.D. program in the United States. The annual tuition in 2022 was $5,000.

Noted alumni
Maria Elena Durazo, California State Senator for the 24th District and former Executive Secretary-Treasurer of the Los Angeles County Federation of Labor, AFL-CIO
Gilbert Cedillo, former state senator and city councilor
 Jeff Cohen, commentator for Fox News Watch, MSNBC, and CNN
Sharon Kyle, Publisher of the LA Progressive 
Kent Wong, Director of the UCLA Labor Center
Eileen Luna Firebaugh, Professor Emeritus University of Arizona American Indian Studies
Carol Sobel, formerly of the ACLU and former Vice President of the National Lawyers Guild
Ilka Tanya Payán, AIDS activist, former New York City Human Rights Commissioner
Antonio Villaraigosa, former Mayor of Los Angeles,

References

External links
 
Peoples College of Law at the LA Progressive

Law schools in California
Educational institutions established in 1974
Universities and colleges in Los Angeles County, California
Private universities and colleges in California
Unaccredited institutions of higher learning in California
1974 establishments in California